The  is an electric multiple unit (EMU) train type operated in Japan by the private railway operator Tobu Railway since 27 October 2012.

Design
The two 2-car sets were rebuilt from former 6050 series sets 6177 and 6178 with completely new interiors and large windows extending into the roof line. The 634 series designation was chosen as it can be read as "Musashi" in Japanese, and coincides with the height in metres of the Tokyo Skytree. Set 1 has a blue theme inside and out, representing "sky", and set 2 has a red theme inside and out, representing "tree".

Formations
The two two-car sets are based at Shin-Tochigi Depot, and are formed as shown below with the Mc car at the southern end.

The Mc car has one cross-arm pantograph.

Interior
Set 1 has blue seating, and set 2 has red seating.

History
The two former 6050 series sets were rebuilt at J-TREC's Yokohama factory, and delivered to Tobu at the end of September 2012. The trains entered service on 27 October 2012. The former Skytree Train limited express services were discontinued from the start of the revised timetable on 21 April 2017.

References

External links

 Tobu news release (27 September 2012) 

Electric multiple units of Japan
634 series
Train-related introductions in 2012

ja:東武6050系電車#634系「スカイツリートレイン」
1500 V DC multiple units of Japan
J-TREC multiple units